Omega (upper case Ω, lower case ω) is the last letter in the Greek alphabet, also used as a symbol.

Omega may also refer to:

Arts, entertainment and media

Fictional entities
 Omega (Doctor Who)
 Omega, a Red vs. Blue character
 Omega, a Maximum Ride character
 Omega, the fictional government agency in the film True Lies
 Omega, in the Mega Man Zero series
 E-123 Omega, a Sonic the Hedgehog character
 Omega, or Genra, a Dead or Alive character
 Omega 13, a time machine in the 1999 science fiction/comedy film Galaxy Quest 
 Omega Ranger, a Power Rangers S.P.D. character
 Omega Rugal, a The King of Fighters character
 The Omegas, in the 2006 film X-Men: The Last Stand
 Omega, in Star Wars: The Bad Batch
 Omega OS, a fictional operating system in the 2018 game PC Building Simulator

Film and television
 Omega (film), a 2008 Greek film
 "Omega", the 12th episode of the TV series Dollhouse
 "The Omega Directive", an episode of Star Trek: Voyager, involving a substance called "Omega" 
 Omega (The Walking Dead), an episode of the television series The Walking Dead

Literature
 Omega (Harris novel), by Christine Harris, 2000
 Omega (McDevitt novel), Jack McDevitt, 2003
 Omega (Leonard novel), by Raymond Leonard, 1986
 Omega: The Last Days of the World, an 1894 science fiction novel by Camille Flammarion
 Omega the Unknown, an American comic book by Marvel Comics

Music

Groups 
 Omega (band), a Hungarian rock band
 Omega and the Mechanical Animals, a moniker adopted by Marilyn Manson and his band

Labels
 Omega (record label), a Dutch record label

Albums
 Omega (Alyson Avenue album), 2004
 Omega (Asia album), 2010
 Omega (Epica album), 2021
 Omega, by Hound Dog, 2005
 Omega, by Azaghal, 2008
 Omega, by Enrique Morente, 1995
 Juggernaut: Omega, by Periphery, 2015, and a song on that album

Songs
 "Ω", by BT from _, 2003
 "Omega", by Bruce Dickinson from Accident of Birth, 1997
 "Omega", Crystal Lake from True North, 2016
 "Omega", Rebecca St. James from Pray, 1998
 "Omega", by SZA from Z, 2014

Other uses in arts, entertainment and media
 Omega (audio drama), based on Doctor Who
 Omega (video game), 1989
 Omega (journal), an academic journal dedicated to the study of death and dying
 Omega Mart, an interactive art installation by Meow Wolf

Businesses and organisations
 OMEGA (counterterrorism unit), in Latvia
 Omega Aerial Refueling Services
 Omega Engineering, an American instrumentation company
 Omega Institute for Holistic Studies, in Rhinebeck, New York, U.S.
 Omega Pharma, a Belgian pharmaceutical company
 Omega SA, a Swiss luxury watchmaker
 Omega Special Task Force, in Georgia 
 Joint Task Force OMEGA, of the Colombian military
 Omega Training Group, providing support for defense-oriented programs
 Omega Trust, a fraudulent American investment scheme

People
 Omega (singer) (born 1979), a Dominican merengue singer
 Kenny Omega, ring name of Canadian wrestler Tyson Smith (born 1983)
 Queen Omega (singer) (born 1981), a Trinidadian reggae singer

Places  
 Omega, California, U.S.
 Omega Hydraulic Diggings, historical gold mining site
 Omega, Georgia, U.S.
 Omega, Indiana, U.S.
 Omega, Oklahoma, U.S.
 Omega Development Site, in Warrington, Cheshire, England

Science and technology

Astronomy and astrodynamics
 Ω, the density parameter in Friedmann equations
 Omega Centauri, a globular cluster in the constellation of Centaurus
 Omega Nebula, a star cluster
 Argument of periapsis, abbreviated ω
 Longitude of the ascending node, abbreviated Ω

Computing 
 Omega (TeX), an extension of the typesetting system
 Omega Drivers, third-party drivers for ATI and nVidia graphics cards
 Ωmega, a strict pure functional programming language
 Omega language, in formal language theory
 Omega2 (computer), by Onion

Mathematics 
 Chaitin's constant, or halting probability, written as Ω
 Lambert W function, or omega function
 Omega constant, a specific value derived from the Lambert W function
 Wright omega function
 ω, the first infinite ordinal number, also understood as the set of all natural numbers
 ω1 or Ω, the smallest uncountable ordinal number
 ω and Ω in big O notation 
 Omega and agemo subgroup, in group theory
 Ω, an element in a subsumption lattice
 Prime omega function , in number theory

Other uses in science and technology
 OMEGA, an instrument on Mars Express Mars orbiter
 OmegA, a cancelled space launch vehicle
 Omega (navigation system), the first worldwide radio navigation system
 OMEGA laser, at the Laboratory for Laser Energetics, University of Rochester, New York, U.S.
 Angular frequency, ω, in physics
 Angular velocity, ω, in physics
 Ka/Ks ratio, or ω, in genetics
 Ohm, symbol Ω, the unit of electrical resistance
 Omega equation, in meteorology
 Omega loop, a protein motif
 Omega baryon, a sub-atomic particle
 OMEGA process, an industrial chemical process to produce ethylene glycol from ethylene

Transportation
 Chevrolet Omega, a car model by General Motors for Brazil
 Oldsmobile Omega, a car, 1973–1984
 Opel Omega, a car, 1986–2004
 Omega (barque), a sailing ship, 1887–1958

Other uses 
 Omega (camera), a brand of cameras and enlargers
 Omega (Cyrillic) (Ѡ, ѡ), the Cyrillic counterpart of the Greek omega
 Omega (grape), another name for the Catawba grape
 Omega chain, a type of collier
 Omega Chess, a chess variant
 OMEGA Championship Wrestling, a wrestling promotion 
 OMEGA Memorandum, a 1956 U.S. memorandum designed to marginalize Gamal Abdel Nasser
 Advance Omega, a Swiss paraglider design

See also 

 Alpha and Omega (disambiguation)
 Omega Point (disambiguation)
 Iomega, a brand of storage media